Putranjiva is a plant genus of the family Putranjivaceae, first described as a genus in 1826. It is native to Southeast Asia, the Indian Subcontinent, Japan, southern China, and New Guinea.

Along with Drypetes (of the same family), it contains mustard oils as a chemical defense against herbivores. The ability to produce glucosinolates is believed to have evolved only twice, in the Putranjivaceae and the Brassicales.

Species
 Putranjiva formosana Kaneh. & Sasaki ex Shimada - Guangdong, Taiwan
 Putranjiva matsumurae Koidz. - Honsu + Ryukyu Islands in Japan
 Putranjiva roxburghii Wall. - Indian Subcontinent (India, Pakistan, Bangladesh, Nepal, Sri Lanka), Indochina, Malaysia, Indonesia, New Guinea
 Putranjiva zeylanica (Thwaites) Müll.Arg.  - Sri Lanka

References

Putranjivaceae
Malpighiales genera